Poyo is a small village in Burkina Faso. It forms part of the Iolonioro Department in the Bougouriba Province. In 2005, Poyo had 805 residents.

References

Populated places in the Sud-Ouest Region (Burkina Faso)
Bougouriba Province